Albert Green (18 April 1907 – q1 1977) was an English footballer who made 23 appearances in the Football League playing for Lincoln City as an inside left. He was on the books of Sheffield Wednesday and West Ham United without representing either club in the league, and also played non-league football for Denaby Rovers, Denaby United, Gainsborough Trinity and Newark Town.

References

1907 births
1977 deaths
Sportspeople from Hanley, Staffordshire
English footballers
Association football inside forwards
Denaby United F.C. players
Sheffield Wednesday F.C. players
Gainsborough Trinity F.C. players
West Ham United F.C. players
Lincoln City F.C. players
Newark Town F.C. players
English Football League players
Southern Football League players